This is a list of airlines of the Northwest Territories which have an air operator's certificate issued by Transport Canada, the country's civil aviation authority. These are airlines that are based in the Northwest Territories.

Current airlines

Defunct airlines

Other

References

Northwest Territories
Airlines